The New York Terminal Radar Approach Control (TRACON) is located in Westbury, Long Island. New York TRACON, also known as N90, is a type of  Federal Aviation Administration air traffic control facility known as a consolidated TRACON, meaning that a single location provides approach service for several large airports. The primary responsibility of the New York TRACON is the safe, orderly, and expeditious flow of arrival, departure, and en-route traffic. N90 is responsible for three major airports, all located within the same New York Class B airspace: John F. Kennedy International Airport, Newark Liberty International Airport, and LaGuardia Airport. Additionally, N90 is responsible for dozens of smaller but busy fields, including Long Island MacArthur Airport, Teterboro Airport, Tweed New Haven Regional Airport, and Westchester County Airport. N90 also controls the large number of VFR aircraft that fly through the New York Class B airspace every day.

The New York TRACON is a Level 12 facility and one of seven "Large TRACONs" currently existing throughout the United States. The others include the Atlanta Large TRACON (A80), the Boston Consolidated TRACON (A90), the Potomac Consolidated TRACON (PCT), the Southern California TRACON (SCT), the Dallas/Fort Worth TRACON (D10), and the Northern California TRACON (NCT). Unlike smaller TRACONs which only utilize one radar, the New York TRACON uses many different airport surveillance radar (ASR) sites, including:
 Newark Liberty International Airport (EWR)
 Westchester County Airport (HPN)
 Islip MacArthur Airport (ISP)
 John F. Kennedy International Airport(JFK)
 Stewart International Airport (SWF)

Area breakdown 
The New York TRACON is divided into 5 areas. Sectors, along with their frequencies and radio sites, are given below.

LaGuardia Area 
The LaGuardia area of the TRACON controls LaGuardia Airport and several busy satellite airports and heliports. JRA (West 30th Street Heliport)  JRB (Wall Street Helipor)), 6N5 (East 34th Street Helipor)). To the North is HPN (Westchester County Airport) and DXR (Danbury Municipal Airport)

 100 LGA - SUP (Supervisor)
101 LGA SP H
102 LGA SP 1S / 19
104 HPN FV 1Z
106 NOBBI - 1X—126.4000 at HPN
108 NYACK - 1Y—120.5500 at HPN
110 HAARP - 1V—120.8000 at LGA Backup at Douglaston
112 LGA - FV - 1F—134.9000 at LGA Backup also at LGA
113 EMPYR - H 11 (Handoff)
114 EMPYR - 1D—127.3000 at EWR Backup at Mount Freedom
115 LGA - DR - H 18 (Handoff)
116 LGA - DR - 1 L -- 120.4000 at LGA Backup at Douglaston
117 H-SEQ (Sequencer)
119 L-SEQ (Sequencer)
121 L-COR (Coordinator)
123 L - F/D LaGuardia Flight Data
125 H - F/D HPN Flight Data

257.65000 at White Plains

263.0000 at LaGuardia

Kennedy Area 
The Kennedy area controls John F. Kennedy International Airport and its only major satellite, Republic Airport. This area controls many international flights from Europe because Kennedy is known in the aviation community as the "Gateway to America".

 200 JFK - SUP (Supervisor)
 202 SP1 2V/2E 126.2200 at JFK
 204 SP2 2D/2Y 127.9200 at JFK
 205 J-SAT-H 20
 206 JFK - SAT - 25 118.4 at JFK
 207 CAMRN H 22
 208 CAMRN - 2G 128.1250 at JFK backup at Douglaston
 210 J - FV - 2A 132.4000 at JFK
 211 J - FV - H25
 212 ROBER - 2K 125.7000 at JFK backup at Douglaston
 213 ROBER - H23
 214 J - DR - 2J 135.9000 at JFK backup at Douglaston
 215 J - DR - H24
 216 ILSMON1 - 2O 119.100 at JFK
 218 ISLMON2 - 2T 123.9 at JFK
 219 J-SEQ (Sequencer)
 221 JFK - F/D (Flight Data)
 223 JFK  F/D 2 (Flight Data)

269.0000 at JFK

Islip Area 
The Islip area controls all low altitude flights along Long Island including Long Island MacArthur Airport, East Hampton Airport, Brookhaven Airport. Francis S. Gabreski Airport, Sikorsky Memorial Airport, Tweed New Haven Airport, Montauk Airport, Waterbury–Oxford Airport, Chester Airport

 300 ISP Supervisor
302 VIKKY - 3Z 128.6200 at CCC (Calverton)
303 SEALL - H36
304 SEALL - 3R 133.100 at CM (Carmel)
305 LOVES - H34
306 LOVES - 31 124.0750 at BD (Bridgeport) Backup at Douglaston
307 BEADS - H 32
308 BEADS - 3B 125.9750 at HT backup at QV (Riverhead)
310 BEADS Low - 3N 118.9500 at HT
312 CCC - 3E 134.5500 at Islip Backup at QV (Riverhead)
314 ISP - 3H 120.0500 at ISP
316 ISP SP 3S/30
317 ISP COR (Coordinator)
319 I - SEQ (Sequencer)
321 I - F/D 2 (Flight Data 2)
323 I F/D (Flight Data)
343.6500 at HT

343.7500 at ISP

Newark Area 
The Newark area of the TRACON covers Newark Liberty International Airport along with the majority of the TRACON's satellite airports including Teterboro Airport, Morristown Municipal Airport, and Caldwell/Essex County Airport.

 400 EWR - SUP
402 E-SPARE - 4O
403 E-SP-H - 4W
404 R22 FV- 4M 125.5000 AT EWR
406 N-ARR- 4A 120.1500 AT EWR
408 ARD - 4P 128.5500 AT EWR Backup at ST (St. Francis)
410 R4FV - 4Q 125.5000 at EWR
412 METRO - 4H 132.8000 AT SB (Solberg)
413 MUGZY - H
414 MUGZY - 4U 127.6000 at EWR Backup at Mount Freedom
416 EWR - SAT - 4E 126.7000 at EWR
417 EWR - DR - H 4D
418 EWR - DR - 4N 119.2000 at EWR (Backup at St. Francis)
421 E - SEQ - 2
420 ZEEBO 4S 123.7750 at Sparta
423 E-SEQ (Sequencer)
425 E - F/D 2 (Flight Data 2)
427 E - F/D (Flight Data)
379.9000 AT EWR

Liberty Area 
The Liberty area's role is for high altitude departure control for all sectors.  The Catskill position has responsibility for numerous satellites to the north of the NY TRACON airspace.  Three of the higher-traffic volume satellites are Stewart International Airport, Orange County Airport, and Dutchess County Airport.

 500 LIB SUP
501 H/O
502 LIB SPARE - 59
503 CAT - H 5B
504 Catskill - 5H 132.7500 at SW (Stewart)
505 LIB SOUTH H  5E
506 LIB SOUTH - 58 124.7500 at EWR Backup at Mount Freedom
507 LIB WEST H 5F
508 LIB WEST 120.8500 at EWR Backup at SB (Solberg)
509 LIB COORD
511 LIB NORTH - H 5I
512 LIB NORTH - 52 118.17 at Laguardia Backup at JFK
513 LIB EAST H 5J
514 LIB EAST - 56 126.8000 at Carmel Backup at PO (Poughkeepsie)
519 B - F/D (Flight Data)
353.7500 South and west at JFK

363.1000 Catskill at HU (Huguenot)

268.7000 North and East at SW (Stewart)

TRAFFIC MANAGEMENT UNIT 

TMU - SC

ARR - DIR

AMIC

DEP - DIR

References 

Air traffic control in the United States
Aviation in New York (state)
Aviation in New York City
Transportation in Nassau County, New York